Tsau may refer to:
 Tsao, Botswana, a village in North-West District of Botswana
 Tsau, a Mars crater, named after the Botswana village
 Tashkent State Agrarian University (TSAO)
 The Sky Above Us with James Albury, a series about astronomy